The white-edged tree frog (Boana albomarginata) is a species of frog in the family Hylidae endemic to Brazil. Its natural habitats are subtropical or tropical moist lowland forests, rivers, freshwater marshes, intermittent freshwater marshes, rural gardens, and heavily degraded former forests.

The Boana albomarginata is a species of which are arboreal but resulting from reproductive patterns, these species are commonly found in ponds and small creeks as these are desired habitats for reproduction.

References

white-edged tree frog
Endemic fauna of Brazil
Amphibians of Brazil
Amphibians described in 1824
Taxonomy articles created by Polbot